Hemihyalea is a monotypic moth genus in the family Erebidae erected by George Hampson in 1901. Its only species, Hemihyalea cornea, was first described by Gottlieb August Wilhelm Herrich-Schäffer in 1853.

Taxonomy
The type species, Hemihyalea cornea, has been proposed for inclusion in Amastus, and other species that were previously classified in Hemihyalea have consequently been moved to the re-established genus Pseudohemihyalea. It is unclear at present whether Hemihyalea is a valid genus at all, and if so, which species other than H. cornea it would contain.

Distribution
Hemihyalea cornea is found in Mexico, Guatemala, Costa Rica, Panama, Colombia and Venezuela.

Footnotes

References

Schmidt, B. Christian (2009). "Revision of the "Aemilia" ambigua (Strecker) species-group (Noctuidae, Arctiinae)". ZooKeys. 9: 63–78. 

Phaegopterina
Moth genera